Mohamed Faisal (born 4 August 1988) is a Maldivian professional footballer who plays as a goalkeeper for Dhivehi Premier League club, Club Valencia and the Maldives national team.

Faisal began his career with Club All Youth Linkage, made his debut as a teenager in 2006 Third Division. He started every match of the season in goal and secured promotion to Second Division football as league runner ups. In his second year, Faisal won both Second Division and Dhivehi League (first division) in 2007 with Club AYL and Victory Sports Club while on loan. He also helped Club AYL promote to Dhivehi League for the first time in club's history. He later played for Victory, Valencia, Club Eagles, New Radiant and Da Grande Sports Club. He joined Valencia on a swap deal on deadline day 2020 from Da Grande Sports Club.

Since his national team debut in 2009, he was mostly used as a back-up goalkeeper and earned number one spot following Imran Mohamed's retirement from international football. He led Maldives to win the 2018 SAFF Championship as the tournament's Most Valuable Player.

Club career
Born in Fenfushi, Maldives, Faisal started his playing career with Club All Youth Linkage in 2006, where he helped the team gain promotion to top division from Third Division, during his four year at the club. During his first season, they gained promotion to Second Division as 2006 Third Division runner-ups, also winning the best goalkeeper award.

Faisal won Second Division and Dhivehi League both in 2007. He first claimed 2007 Second Division with Club AYL but failed to get promoted to first division in the play-off. He was then loaned to Victory Sports Club for the rest of the season as their first choice Imran Mohamed got injured, and won first division with them.

In 2008, Faisal earned another best goalkeeper award despite Club AYL were runner-ups of the 2008 Second Division. They also gained promotion to first division football, winning the play-offs.

Faisal left Club AYL to play for Victory SC in 2010, making his debut in the AFC Cup against Indonesian club Sriwijaya. He won the FA Cup and President's Cup in his first two seasons. In 2012, Faisal fractured a bone in his left ankle in the AFC Cup qualifying round against Al-Tilal which sidelined him for five months.

On 2 November 2012, Faisal signed for Club Valencia on a one year deal for the 2013 season.

Faisal became a Club Eagles player on 25 February 2014.  Faisal helped Club Eagles, qualify to the President's Cup for the first time in the club's history, after securing third in the league. They reached the final where they lost to the only goal which came in the extra time.

On 9 April 2015, Faisal suffered an ACL injury during the pre season trainings with Club Eagles. After a gap of one season without a game, Faisal returned for Club Valencia on 7 January 2016. They became the ultimate champions of the 2016 FA Cup, defeating the league runner ups TC Sports Club in the final, ending a trophy drought of 8 years for the club.

On 25 July 2017, Faisal joined New Radiant as Club Valencia failed to secure a top 4 spot in 2017 Malé League. He won a domestic treble in 2017, winning the Premier League, FA Cup and the President's Cup. He also won the Malé League with New Radiant in 2018.

Faisal signed for Da Grande Sports Club on 28 May 2019. He spent one season with the club until returning to Club Valencia for the third time, on a deadline day; 5 December 2020, swap with Mohamed Jazlaan.

On 21 January 2021, Faisal made his third Valencia debut against the newly promoted Super United Sports in the last gameweek of Dhivehi Premier League first round, keeping a clean sheet in the goalless draw. During a Premier League match against United Victory on 22 April 2021, Faisal suffered a hamstring injury, forcing him to make way for Mohamed Shafeeu in the 40th minute of the game.

International career
Faisal made his international debut on 18 April 2009, against Bhutan in the 2010 AFC Challenge Cup qualification. He kept a clean sheet to his name in the game as Maldives won by 5–0.

In 2010, he was called up for the 2010 South Asian Games, where he won bronze with the national under-23 team. He only played the third-place play-off match against India, in which he saved two penalties to win the penalty shoot-out.

Following the retirement of then goalkeeper Imran Mohamed, Faisal was the number one goalkeeper for the national team since 2017. His first major tournament was the 2018 SAFF Championship in which they won the tournament for the second time in their history, also winning the best player award.

Career statistics

Club

International

Honours

Club
Club AYL
Third Division: Runner-up 2006
Second Division: 2007; Runner-up 2008

Victory
Dhivehi League: 2007
FA Charity Shield: Runner-up 2010, 2011, 2012
Maldives FA Cup: 2010; Third 2007, 2011
President's Cup: 2011; Runner-up 2007, 2010, 2012

Eagles
President's Cup: Runner-up 2014

Valencia
Maldives FA Cup: 2016
FA Charity Shield: Runner-up 2017

New Radiant
Dhivehi Premier League: 2017
Maldives FA Cup: 2017
President's Cup: 2017
Malé League: 2018

International
Maldives
SAFF Championship: 2018

Maldives under-23
South Asian Games Bronze: 2010

Individual
 2006 Third Division best goalkeeper
 2008 Second Division best goalkeeper
 2018 SAFF Championship Most Valuable Player
 2018 SAFF Championship best goalkepper

References

External links
 
 
 Mohamed Faisal at Maldivesoccer.com
 Mohamed Faisal (2012) at Maldivesoccer
 Mohamed Faisal (2013) at Maldivesoccer
 Mohamed Faisal (2014) at Maldivesoccer
 Faisal lodge complin against Valencia at FAM at Vnews
 Faisal leaves national team at Vnews
 Faisal was about to retire due to injuries but now he is performing at top level - Imran at Sun

1988 births
Living people
Maldivian footballers
Maldives international footballers
Victory Sports Club players
Club Valencia players
Association football goalkeepers
Footballers at the 2010 Asian Games
Asian Games competitors for the Maldives
Club Eagles players
Da Grande Sports Club players